Mizuko (written:  or ) is a feminine Japanese given name. Notable people with then name include:

, Japanese cultural anthropologist
, Japanese writer
, Director of the Girl Scouts of Japan
, Japanese physician

The name is not generally written with the kanji 水子, meaning water child, due to the combination also meaning a stillborn baby.

See also
Mizuko kuyō, a Japanese ceremony

References

Japanese feminine given names